The 1989 XXV FIBA International Christmas Tournament "Trofeo Raimundo Saporta-Memorial Fernando Martín" was the 25th edition of the FIBA International Christmas Tournament. It took place at Palacio de Deportes de la Comunidad de Madrid, Madrid, Spain, on 24, 25 and 26 December 1989 with the participations of Real Madrid (champions of the 1988–89 FIBA European Cup Winners' Cup), Jugoplastika (champions of the 1988–89 FIBA European Champions Cup), Aris (champions of the 1988–89 Greek Basket League) and Maccabi Elite Tel Aviv (runners-up of the 1988–89 FIBA European Champions Cup).

League stage

Day 1, December 24, 1989

|}

Day 2, December 25, 1989

|}

Day 3, December 26, 1989

|}

Final standings

References

1989–90 in European basketball
1989–90 in Greek basketball
1989–90 in Spanish basketball
1989–90 in Yugoslav basketball